Dorcadion hampii is a species of beetle in the family Cerambycidae. It was described by Mulsant and Rey in 1863. It is known from Turkey.

Subspecies
 Dorcadion hampii aureovittatum Kraatz, 1873
 Dorcadion hampii hampii Mulsant & Rey, 1863

References

hampii
Beetles described in 1863